Thelma H. Kalama (March 24, 1931 – May 17, 1999), later known by her married name Thelma Aiu, was an American competition swimmer and Olympic champion.  She competed at the 1948 Summer Olympics in London, where she won a gold medal in the women's 4×100-meter freestyle relay, together with her teammates Marie Corridon, Brenda Helser and Ann Curtis.  The U.S. relay team set a new Olympic record of 4:29.2 in the event final.

Kalama was inducted into the Hawaii Sports Hall of Fame in 1998, and the Hawaii Swimming Hall of Fame as a posthumously member of its first class of honorees in 2002.

See also
 List of Olympic medalists in swimming (women)

References

External links
 

1931 births
1999 deaths
American female freestyle swimmers
Olympic gold medalists for the United States in swimming
Swimmers at the 1948 Summer Olympics
United States Marines
Female United States Marine Corps personnel
Medalists at the 1948 Summer Olympics
Swimmers from Hawaii
20th-century American women